Thomas Cummings may refer to:

 Tommy Vext (Thomas Cummings, born 1982), American heavy metal singer and songwriter
 Thomas L. Cummings Sr. (1891–1968), mayor of Nashville, Tennessee
 Thomas Seir Cummings (1804–1894), American miniature painter and author